Danny Lenarduzzi (born August 31, 1959) is a former Canadian soccer player who played for Vancouver Whitecaps in the NASL.

International career
Lenarduzzi played for the Canada men's national under-20 soccer team, making three appearances at the 1979 FIFA World Youth Championship.

Personal life
Lenarduzzi is the brother of fellow former professional footballers Bob and Sam Lenarduzzi.

Career statistics

Club

Notes

References

1959 births
Living people
Canadian people of Italian descent
Canadian soccer players
Canada men's youth international soccer players
Association football defenders
North American Soccer League (1968–1984) players
Vancouver Whitecaps (1974–1984) players
Toronto Blizzard (1971–1984) players
Toronto Nationals (soccer) players